Marcela Ortiz Montalván (born 23 September 1996) is a Bolivian footballer who plays as a midfielder for the Bolivia women's national team.

International career
Ortiz represented Bolivia at the 2012 South American U-17 Women's Championship and two South American U-20 Women's Championship editions (2014 and 2015). At senior level, she played the 2018 Copa América Femenina.

References

1996 births
Living people
Women's association football midfielders
Bolivian women's footballers
Bolivia women's international footballers